Lasius subglaber is a species of ant belonging to the genus Lasius, formerly a part of the genus (now a subgenus) Acanthomyops. Described in 1893 by Emery, the species is native to the United States and Canada.

References

External links

subglaber
Hymenoptera of North America
Insects of the United States
Insects of Canada
Insects described in 1893